Berek may refer to:

Places 
 Berek, Croatia, a municipality
 Berek (Gradiška), village in Republika Srpska, Bosnia and Herzegovina

People
In Polish, Berek is a diminutive of the names Baruch or Ber, and later a name in its own right.
 Berek Freiberg, better known as Dov Freiberg (1927–2008), Polish Jewish Holocaust survivor, writer, and witness at the Eichmann trial and the Demjanjuk case
 Berek Joselewicz (1764–1809), Polish Jewish colonel of the Polish Army
 Berek Lajcher (1893–1943), Polish Jewish physician and social activist, officer of the Polish Army
 Jan Berek (1896–1986), Polish army officer
 Jonathan Berek, Professor and Chair of the Department of Obstetrics and Gynecology at Stanford University School of Medicine
 Katalin Berek (1930–2017), Hungarian actress
 Michael Berek, East German slalom canoeist
 Peter Berek, Professor of English and Shakespearean scholar at Amherst College

Fictional characters
 Berek Halfhand, from The Chronicles of Thomas Covenant series

Polish masculine given names